The J.League Cup / Copa Sudamericana Championship was an annual intercontinental football match held in Japan, contested by the reigning champions of the J.League Cup and the Copa Sudamericana.

The tournament was previously officially called the Suruga Bank Championship between 2008 and 2018 as it was sponsored by Suruga Bank. Starting in 2019, it was the "J. League YBC Levain Cup / CONMEBOL Sudamericana Championship Final", using the official names of the two qualifying tournaments.

History
The J.League Cup / Copa Sudamericana Championship was established in early 2008 by the Japan Football Association (JFA), CONMEBOL, and J. League, and sponsored by Suruga Bank in Japan. The championship is hosted annually at the J. League Cup champion's home stadium.

The first match was played on July 30, 2008, at Nagai Stadium in Osaka where Argentina's Arsenal defeated Japan's Gamba Osaka by 1–0.

Finals

Notes

Performances

By club

By nation

References

External links
 Official J. League website 
 Official JFA website 
 Official CONMEBOL website

 
International club association football competitions hosted by Japan
CONMEBOL club competitions